Margolese is a surname. Notable people with the surname include:

David Margolese (born 1957), Israeli entrepreneur and philanthropist
Faranak Margolese (born 1972), American-Israeli writer
Richard Margolese (born 1935), Canadian scientist